Shorshely (Şurşăl) is a town in Chuvashia Russia, situated between Anatkasy and Yerdovo, and nearby to Atlashevo and Yel’nikovo. It is on the Volga River.

The village has a museum of Space exploration, and is the site of the interment of a local resident

References

Cities and towns in Chuvashia
Cheboksarsky Uyezd
Populated places on the Volga